John Walker (17 November 1883 – 16 December 1968) was a Scottish professional footballer who played as a left back and is perhaps best remembered for his six seasons in the Southern League with Swindon Town. He also played in the Scottish League for Raith Rovers, Rangers and Cowdenbeath and in the Football League for Middlesbrough and Reading. Although convicted of sexual assault and imprisoned in 1917, he was able to resume his career upon being released. After retiring from football he ran a fish-and-chip shop in Swindon.

Walker won nine caps for Scotland at international level and represented the Southern League XI.

Career statistics

Honours 
Swindon Town
Southern League First Division: 1910–11

Individual
 Cowdenbeath Hall of Fame

Notes

References

Sources

1883 births
1968 deaths
Footballers from North Ayrshire
Scottish footballers
Scotland international footballers
Raith Rovers F.C. players
Beith F.C. players
Ayr Parkhouse F.C. players
Royal Albert F.C. players
Rangers F.C. players
Swindon Town F.C. players
Middlesbrough F.C. players
Reading F.C. players
Association football fullbacks
Southern Football League players
English Football League players
Cambuslang Rangers F.C. players
Burnbank Athletic F.C. players
Cowdenbeath F.C. players
Swindon Town F.C. wartime guest players
Southern Football League representative players
Scottish Junior Football Association players
British people convicted of sexual assault
Sportspeople convicted of crimes
Scottish prisoners and detainees
People from Beith